The 1938 Cupa României Final was the fifth final of Romania's most prestigious football cup competition. It was disputed between CAM Timișoara and Rapid București, and was won by Rapid București after a game with 5 goals. It was the third cup for Rapid, and the second of six consecutive successes.

CAM Timișoara was the first club representing Divizia B which reached the Romanian Cup final.

Match details

See also 
List of Cupa României finals

References

External links
Romaniansoccer.ro

1938
Cupa
Romania